The following is a list of films to reach the number-one spot on the box office in the United States:

 List of 1958 box office number-one films in the United States
 List of 1959 box office number-one films in the United States
 List of 1960 box office number-one films in the United States
 List of 1961 box office number-one films in the United States
 List of 1962 box office number-one films in the United States
 List of 1963 box office number-one films in the United States
 List of 1964 box office number-one films in the United States
 List of 1965 box office number-one films in the United States
 List of 1966 box office number-one films in the United States
 List of 1967 box office number-one films in the United States
 List of 1968 box office number-one films in the United States
 List of 1969 box office number-one films in the United States
 List of 1970 box office number-one films in the United States
 List of 1971 box office number-one films in the United States
 List of 1972 box office number-one films in the United States
 List of 1973 box office number-one films in the United States
 List of 1974 box office number-one films in the United States
 List of 1975 box office number-one films in the United States
 List of 1976 box office number-one films in the United States
 List of 1977 box office number-one films in the United States
 List of 1978 box office number-one films in the United States
 List of 1979 box office number-one films in the United States
 List of 1980 box office number-one films in the United States
 List of 1981 box office number-one films in the United States
 List of 1982 box office number-one films in the United States
 List of 1983 box office number-one films in the United States
 List of 1984 box office number-one films in the United States
 List of 1985 box office number-one films in the United States
 List of 1986 box office number-one films in the United States
 List of 1987 box office number-one films in the United States
 List of 1988 box office number-one films in the United States
 List of 1989 box office number-one films in the United States
 List of 1990 box office number-one films in the United States
 List of 1991 box office number-one films in the United States
 List of 1992 box office number-one films in the United States
 List of 1993 box office number-one films in the United States
 List of 1994 box office number-one films in the United States
 List of 1995 box office number-one films in the United States
 List of 1996 box office number-one films in the United States
 List of 1997 box office number-one films in the United States
 List of 1998 box office number-one films in the United States
 List of 1999 box office number-one films in the United States
 List of 2000 box office number-one films in the United States
 List of 2001 box office number-one films in the United States
 List of 2002 box office number-one films in the United States
 List of 2003 box office number-one films in the United States
 List of 2004 box office number-one films in the United States
 List of 2005 box office number-one films in the United States
 List of 2006 box office number-one films in the United States
 List of 2007 box office number-one films in the United States
 List of 2008 box office number-one films in the United States
 List of 2009 box office number-one films in the United States
 List of 2010 box office number-one films in the United States
 List of 2011 box office number-one films in the United States
 List of 2012 box office number-one films in the United States
 List of 2013 box office number-one films in the United States
 List of 2014 box office number-one films in the United States
 List of 2015 box office number-one films in the United States
 List of 2016 box office number-one films in the United States
 List of 2017 box office number-one films in the United States
 List of 2018 box office number-one films in the United States
 List of 2019 box office number-one films in the United States
 List of 2020 box office number-one films in the United States
 List of 2021 box office number-one films in the United States
 List of 2022 box office number-one films in the United States
 List of 2023 box office number-one films in the United States

See also 

 Lists of American films